Island mentality is the notion of isolated communities perceiving themselves as exceptional or superior to the rest of the world. This term does not directly refer to an island or other geographically confined society, but to the cultural, moral, or ideological superiority of a community or a person that lacks social exposure to the outside world. Island mentality can be characterized by narrow-mindedness, ignorance, or outright hostility towards any artifact (concept, ideology, lifestyle choice, art form, etc.) originating from outside the geographic area inhabited by the society.

The term "island mentality" is also used in some psychological research to describe individuals who dislike or have problems with relating to others, and then live as loners or "islands". This concept (in which people may feel inferior, afraid, or alone) is unrelated to the above terminology.

See also
 Ethnocentrism
 Exceptionalism
 Galápagos syndrome
 Groupthink
 Light unto the nations
 Not invented here
 Shtetl
 Siege mentality

References
 Israel and Pacific republics, united by an island mentality
 Desert the island mentality
 Ditch the island mentality

Appeals to emotion
Mentality
Sociological theories